The Forward Pass is a 1929 American Pre-Code football drama musical film directed by Edward F. Cline, starring Douglas Fairbanks Jr and Loretta Young. John Wayne was an uncredited extra in the film. The film is believed to be lost.

Plot
Tired of being hit and hurt, football star Marty Reid decides to quit Sanford College's team. His buddy Honey Smith understands, but teammate Ed Kirby is so angry, he calls Reid a coward.

Reid schemes to have campus coed Pat Carlyle make a play for Reid, coaxing him to return to the field of play. Reid does, but fumbles when he discovers he has been tricked, then gets into a fistfight with Kirby in the locker room. Convinced now that his rival is not a coward, Kirby invites Reid to go back to the field and win the big game.

Cast
 Douglas Fairbanks Jr. as Marty Reid
 Loretta Young as Patricia Carlyle
 Guinn 'Big Boy' Williams as Honey Smith 
 Marion Byron as Mazie
 Phyllis Crane as Dot
 Bert Rome as Coach Wilson
 Lane Chandler as Assistant Coach Kane
 Allan Lane as Ed Kirby
 John Wayne as Extra (uncredited)

Soundtrack

 "Hello, Baby" or H'lo Baby
Music and lyrics by Herb Magidson, Ned Washington, Michael H. Cleary.
 "One Minute Of Heaven"
Music and lyrics by Herb Magidson, Ned Washington, Michael H. Cleary.
 "I Gotta Have You"
Music and lyrics by Herb Magidson, Ned Washington, Michael H. Cleary.
 "Huddlin'"
Music and lyrics by Herb Magidson, Ned Washington, Michael H. Cleary.

See also
 List of American films of 1929

References

External links

The Forward Pass details, Answers.com
The Forward Pass details, tcm.com

1929 films
American black-and-white films
American football films
Lost American films
First National Pictures films
Films directed by Edward F. Cline
1920s musical drama films
American musical drama films
1929 drama films
Lost musical drama films
1920s American films